Richard Friese (15 December 1854 – 29 June 1918) was a German animal and landscape painter.

Biography
He was born in Gumbinnen. He studied at the Academy in Berlin, where, after traveling in the orient, in Norway, and as far as the polar regions, he rapidly acquired his present reputation as one of the best animal painters in Germany, especially noted for his vivid delineations of the lion's life in the desert, and also of the native deer world in the German forest. He was awarded a gold medal in 1886, and elected a member of the Berlin Academy in 1892. He died in 1918 in Bad Zwischenahn.

Works
His most noteworthy productions include:
 “Lions Surprising Caravan's Camp” (1884), Dresden Gallery
 “Elks on Field of Battle” (1890), National Gallery, Berlin
 “In the Bredszell Moor” (1895), Königsberg Museum
 “A Twenty-pronged Stag under Way,” owned by Emperor William II

See also
 List of German painters

References

 
 

1854 births
1918 deaths
19th-century German painters
19th-century German male artists
German male painters
20th-century German painters
20th-century German male artists
Prussian Academy of Arts alumni
People from Gusev